Agyneta dactylis is a species of sheet weaver found in China. It was described by Tao, Li & Zhu in 1995.

References

dactylis
Spiders described in 1995
Spiders of China